Francesco Cassata (born 16 July 1997) is an Italian professional footballer who plays as a midfielder for  club Ternana, on loan from Genoa.

Club career
On 18 January 2022, Cassata joined Parma on loan until the end of the 2021–22 season, with an option to buy.

On 30 August 2022, Cassata was loaned to Ternana with an option to buy.

International career
On 6 September 2018, Cassata made his debut with Italy U21 team in a friendly match lost 3–0 against Slovakia.

Career statistics

References

External links
 

Living people
1997 births
Association football midfielders
Italian footballers
Italy under-21 international footballers
Italy youth international footballers
Serie A players
Serie B players
Juventus F.C. players
Ascoli Calcio 1898 F.C. players
U.S. Sassuolo Calcio players
Frosinone Calcio players
Genoa C.F.C. players
Parma Calcio 1913 players
Ternana Calcio players